Liro may refer to:
Liro, Benin
A village on the Vanuatuan island of Paama

The Liro is the name of two streams in the Italian region of Lombardy.
The Liro (Como) of the Province of Como, which runs through the Valle San Iorio and enters Lake Como at Gravedona
The Liro (Sondrio) of the Province of Sondrio, which runs through the Valle Spluga (or Val San Giacomo) and is a tributary of the river Mera